Coffee Stain Studios AB is a Swedish video game developer based in Skövde. Founded in 2010 by nine University of Skövde students, the company is best known for Goat Simulator, which was released in April 2014, and Satisfactory, released as an early access game in 2019. Their parent holding company also operates Coffee Stain Publishing, a publisher, and majority-owns developers Coffee Stain North (formerly Gone North Games) and Lavapotion. In November 2018, the Coffee Stain group was acquired by THQ Nordic AB (later known as Embracer Group).

History 

Coffee Stain Studios was founded in 2010 in Skövde, Sweden, by a group of nine students at the University of Skövde: Anton Westbergh, Johannes Aspeby, Mikael Mård, Oscar Jilsén, Gustaf Tivander, Daniel Lundwall, Markus Rännare, Joakim Sjöö and Stefan Hanna. Their first game, I Love Strawberries, was released at the end of that year for iOS by Atari.

In 2010, Coffee Stain participated in "Make Something Unreal", a modding competition for Unreal Tournament 3 held by Epic Games and Intel, with their mod, Sanctum. The mod was received well, leading Coffee Stain to adopt the Unreal Development Kit to develop Sanctum into a standalone game. In March the following year, the company struck a five-year licensing agreement with Epic for their Unreal Engine 3 technology. Sanctum as a standalone game was released in April 2011, and was followed by a sequel, Sanctum 2, in May 2013. In February 2014, Coffee Stain acquired the rights for I Love Strawberries from Atari and re-released the game for iOS with some improvements.

Coffee Stain gained significant recognition with their April 2014 release of Goat Simulator. While the title received mixed critical reviews, as it was released in a purposely buggy state to take advantage of its ragdoll physics, it became highly successful through Let's Play videos and live streamers.

On 23 February 2017, Coffee Stain announced Coffee Stain Publishing, a subsidiary that would act as the publishing entity within the Coffee Stain group. The first title to be released through Coffee Stain Publishing was Huntdown by Swedish development team Easy Trigger Games. The following day, Coffee Stain acquired a minority stake in Danish developer Ghost Ship Games, becoming the publisher of their upcoming game, Deep Rock Galactic. In April 2017, Coffee Stain also invested in newly founded, Gothenburg-based studio Lavapotion, gaining a minority stake. In July 2017, Daniel Kaplan, the first employee of Swedish developer Mojang, left Mojang to join Coffee Stain Publishing.

On 30 January 2018, Coffee Stain announced Levelling the Playing Field, a funding initiative aimed at small companies that employ at least as many women as men and require at most  (about ) in funding. Through this initiative, Coffee Stain invested in Danish developer Other Tales Interactive (a team of two women) in exchange for a minority stake. A second studio, Stockholm-based Kavalri, was invested in under this programme in November 2019. The following day, Coffee Stain acquired a majority stake in Gone North Games, a Swedish developer that had developed Coffee Stain-published A Story About My Uncle and downloadable content for Goat Simulator. With the acquisition, Gone North Games was rebranded as Coffee Stain North.

Coffee Stain continues to operate independently within Embracer Group, with Coffee Stain co-founder Westbergh remaining chief executive officer. At the time, the Coffee Stain group had 45 employees, of which Coffee Stain Studios employed 24. This number rose to 25 by August 2019.

Coffee Stain expanded Levelling the Playing Field in September 2020 to cover teams including racially and ethnically diverse people, women and non-binary people. Happy Broccoli Games became the third investment under this initiative. On November 18, 2020, Embracer announced they would purchase out the 40% stake in Coffee Stain North from their founders and transition it to a fully-owned subsidiary of Coffee Stain.

In August 2021, Embracer Group acquired Ghost Ship Games and Easy Trigger, having them both be under the umbrella of Coffee Stain Holding. In March 2022, Coffee Stain announced that they had partnered with Rare Earth Games, an Austrian developer owned by Coffee Stain's sister company Amplifier Game Invest, to publish a new co-op action IP.

In August 2022, as part of a large purchase of properties, Embracer was confirmed to have acquired a "secret developer" for $100 million which would transition under Coffee Stain. In December, it was revealed by several news outlets that the purchase was of the Roblox game developer Shortcake AB and their game "Welcome to Bloxburg" for $100 million, and renamed as Coffee Stain Gothenburg. The game's creator, Coeptus, officially confirmed the new partnership in January 2023.

Subsidiaries

Coffee Stain Holding
 Box Dragon in Gothenburg, Sweden, Founded in 2020, majority stake purchased in August 2021. (majority)
 Coffee Stain Malmö in Malmö, Sweden, founded in February 2022.
 Coffee Stain Gothenburg in Gothenburg, Sweden, founded as Shortcake AB, acquired in August 2022.
 Coffee Stain North in Stockholm, Sweden, founded as Gone North Games in 2013, 60% majority stake acquired in January 2018, fully purchased in November 2020.
 Coffee Stain Publishing, founded in February 2017.
 Coffee Stain Studios in Skövde, Sweden, founded in 2010
 Easy Trigger in Trollhättan, Sweden, founded in 2016, acquired in August 2021.
 Iron Gate Studios in Skövde, Sweden, founded in April 2019, 30% minority stake purchased in February 2021.
 Lavapotion in Gothenburg, Sweden, founded in 2017, 60% majority stake purchased in April 2017.
 Other Tales Interactive in Copenhagen, Denmark, founded in November 2016, 20% minority stake purchased in January 2018.

Ghost Ship Holding
Ghost Ship Holding, the holding business for developer Ghost Ship Games, was acquired by Embracer Group in August 2021 and placed under Coffee Stain Holding. It operates as a separate subsidiary. 
 Ghost Ship Games in Copenhagen, Denmark, founded in Spring 2016.
 Ghost Ship Publishing, founded in February 2023.
 Game Swing in Copenhagen, Denmark, founded in 2013, minority stake purchased in May 2022.
 Half Past Yellow in Copenhagen, Denmark, founded in 2017, minority stake purchased in May 2022.
 Ugly Duckling Games in Aarhus, Denmark, founded in 2019, minority stake purchased in May 2022.

Games developed

Games published

References

External links 
 

2018 mergers and acquisitions
Companies based in Västra Götaland County
Embracer Group
Skövde
Swedish companies established in 2010
Video game companies established in 2010
Video game companies of Sweden
Video game development companies
Video game publishers